Grand Chess Tour 2019 – was a series of chess tournaments, held in from 6 May to 10 December 2019. It was the fifth edition of Grand Chess Tour. The tour consisted of 8 tournaments, includin 2 classical, 5 fast tournaments and tour final in London, the United Kingdom. It was won by Ding Liren from China.

Format 
The tour featured 8 tournaments, including 12 full participants and 14 wildcard. Top 4 after 7 tournaments qualifies to the tour finals in London.
The points awarded as follows:
{| class="wikitable" style="text-align:center;"
! Place !! Points (classical) !! Points (rapid/blitz)
|-
| 1st || 18/20* || 12/13*
|-
| 2nd || 15 || 10
|-
| 3rd || 12 || 8
|-
| 4th || 10 || 7
|-
|  5th || 8  || 6
|-
|  6th || 7 || 5
|-
|  7th || 6 || 4
|-
| 8th || 5 || 3
|-
|  9th || 4 || 2
|-
| 10th || 3 || 1
|-
| 11th || 2 || N/A
|-
| 12th || 1 || N/A
|}

Schedule and results

Tournaments

Cote d'Ivoire Rapid & Blitz 
{| class="wikitable" style="text-align: center;"
|+Cote d'Ivoire Grand Chess Tour Rapid, 8–10 May 2019, Abidjan, Ivory Coast
! !! Player !! Rating !! 1 !! 2 !! 3 !! 4 !! 5 !! 6 !! 7 !! 8 !! 9 !! 10 !! Points
|-
|-style="background:#ccffcc;"
| 1 || align=left| || 2869 || || ½ || 1 || 1 || ½ || 1 || ½ || 1 || 1 || 1 || 7½
|-
| 2 || align="left" | || 2824 || ½ ||  || ½ || 1 || 1 || ½ || 1 || ½ || 0 || 1 || 6
|-
| 3 || align="left" | || 2801 || 0 || ½ ||  || ½ || ½ || ½ || ½ || 1 || 1 || 1 || 5½
|-
| 4 || align="left" | || 2800 || 0 || 0 || ½ ||  || ½ || 1 || 1 || ½ || 1 || 1 || 5½
|-
| 5 || align="left" | || 2760 || ½ || 0 || ½ || ½ ||  || 0 || ½ || 1 || 1 || 1 || 5
|-
| 6 || align="left" | || 2698 || 0 || ½ || ½ || 0 || 1 ||  || ½ || ½ || 1 || ½ || 4½
|-
| 7 || align="left" | || 2781 || ½ || 0 || ½ || 0 || ½ || ½ ||  || ½ || 0 || ½ || 3
|-
| 8 || align="left" | || 2781 || 0 || ½ || 0 || ½ || 0 || ½ || ½ ||  || ½ || ½ || 3
|-
| 9 || align="left" | || 2617 || 0 || 1 || 0 || 0 || 0 || 0 || 1 || ½ ||  || 0 || 2½
|-
| 10 || align="left" | || 2785 || 0 || 0 || 0 || 0 || 0 || ½ || ½ || ½ || 1 ||  || 2½
|}

Croatia Grand Chess Tour 
{| class="wikitable" style="text-align: center;"
|+ Zagreb Chess Classic, 24 June – 9 July 2019, Zagreb, Croatia, Category XXII (2782)
! !! Player !! Rating !! 1 !! 2 !! 3 !! 4 !! 5 !! 6 !! 7 !! 8 !! 9 !! 10 !! 11 !! 12 !! Points !! TB !! Place !! TPR !! GCT Points
|-
|-style="background:#ccffcc;"
| 1 || align=left||| 2875 || || ½ || ½ || ½ || 1 || 1 || 1 || ½ || 1 || ½ || ½ || 1 ||8 || || 1 || 2955 || 20
|-
| 2 || align=left| || 2754 || ½ ||  || ½ || ½ || 1 || ½ || ½ || ½ || ½ || 1 || ½ || 1 ||7 || || 2 || 2893 || 15
|-
| 3 || align=left| || 2752 || ½ || ½ ||  || ½ || ½ || ½ || ½ || 1 || ½ || ½ || ½ || ½ ||6 || || 3–4 || 2821 || 11
|-
| 4 || align=left| || 2819 || ½ || ½ || ½ ||  || ½ || ½ || 0 || ½ || 1 || ½ || ½ || 1 ||6 || || 3–4 || 2815 || 11
|-
| 5 || align=left| || 2805 || 0 || 0 || ½ || ½ ||  || 1 || 1 || ½ || ½ || ½ || ½ || ½ ||5½ || || 5–7 || 2780 || 7
|-
| 6 || align=left| || 2779 || 0 || ½ || ½ || ½ || 0 ||  || 1 || ½ || ½ || 1 || ½ || ½ ||5½ || || 5–7 || 2782 || 7
|-
| 7 || align=left| || 2775 || 0 || ½ || ½ || 1 || 0 || 0 ||  || ½ || ½ || 1 || 1 || ½  ||5½ || || 5–7 || 2782 || 7
|-
| 8 || align=left| || 2748 || ½ || ½ || 0 || ½ || ½ || ½ || ½ ||  || ½ || ½ || ½ || ½ ||5 || || 8 || 2748 || 5
|-
| 9 || align=left| || 2779 || 0 || ½ || ½ || 0 || ½ || ½ || ½ || ½ ||  || ½ || ½ || ½ ||4½ || || 9–11 || 2709 || 3
|-
| 10 || align=left| || 2774 || ½ || 0 || ½ || ½ || ½ || 0 || 0 || ½ || ½ ||  || 1 || ½ ||4½ || || 9–11 || 2710 || 3
|-
| 11 || align=left| || 2767 || ½ || ½ || ½ || ½ || ½ || ½ || 0 || ½ || ½ || 0 ||  || ½ ||4½ || || 9–11 || 2710 || 3
|-
| 12 || align=left| || 2754 || 0 || 0 || ½ || 0 || ½ || ½ || ½ || ½ || ½ || ½ || ½ ||  ||4 || || 12 || 2675 || 1
|}

Paris Rapid & Blitz

Saint Louis Rapid & Blitz

Sinquefield Cup 
{| class="wikitable" style="text-align: center;"
|+ 7th Sinquefield Cup, 17–29 August 2019, St. Louis, Missouri, United States, Category XXII (2783)
! !! Player !! Rating !! 1 !! 2 !! 3 !! 4 !! 5 !! 6 !! 7 !! 8 !! 9 !! 10 !! 11 !! 12 !! Points !! TB !! Place !! TPR !! GCT Points
|-
|-style="background:#ccffcc;"
| 1 || align=left||| 2805 || || ½ || ½ || ½ || 1 || 1 || ½ || ½ || ½ || ½ || ½ || ½ ||6½ || 3 || 1 || 2845 || 16½
|-
| 2 || align=left| || 2882 || ½ ||  || ½ || ½ || ½ || ½ || ½ || ½ || 1 || ½ || 1 || ½ ||6½ || 1 || 2 || 2838 || 16½
|-
| 3 || align=left| || 2756 || ½ || ½ ||  || ½ || ½ || ½ || 1 || ½ || ½ || ½ || ½ || ½ ||6 || || 3–4 || 2820 || 11
|-
| 4 || align=left| || 2750 || ½ || ½ || ½ ||  || ½ || ½ || ½ || ½ || 1 || ½ || ½ || ½ ||6 || || 3–4 || 2821 || 11
|-
| 5 || align=left| || 2818 || 0 || ½ || ½ || ½ ||  || ½ || ½ || ½ || ½ || ½ || ½ || 1 ||5½ || || 5–8 || 2779 || 6½
|-
| 6 || align=left| || 2779 || 0 || ½ || ½ || ½ || ½ ||  || 1 || ½ || ½ || ½ || ½ || ½ ||5½ || || 5–8 || 2782 || 6½
|-
| 7 || align=left| || 2774 || ½ || ½ || 0 || ½ || ½ || 0 ||  || ½ || 0 || 1 || 1 || 1  ||5½ || || 5–8 || 2783 || 6½
|-
| 8 || align=left| || 2764 || ½ || ½ || ½ || ½ || ½ || ½ || ½ ||  || ½ || ½ || ½ || ½ ||5½ || || 5–8 || 2784 || 6½
|-
| 9 || align=left| || 2778 || ½ || 0 || ½ || 0 || ½ || ½ || 1 || ½ ||  || ½ || ½ || ½ ||5 || || 9–10 || 2746 || 3½
|-
| 10 || align=left| || 2743 || ½ || ½ || ½ || ½ || ½ || ½ || 0 || ½ || ½ ||  || ½ || ½ ||5 || || 9–10 || 2750 || 3½
|-
| 11 || align=left| || 2776 || ½ || 0 || ½ || ½ || ½ || ½ || 0 || ½ || ½ || ½ ||  || ½ ||4½ || || 11–12 || 2718 || 1½
|-
| 12 || align=left| || 2765 || ½ || ½ || ½ || ½ || 0 || ½ || 0 || ½ || ½ || ½ || ½ ||  ||4½ || || 11–12 || 2719 || 1½
|}

{| class="wikitable" style="text-align: center;"
|+ First place playoff, 29 August 2019, St. Louis, Missouri, United States
! Place !! Player !! Rapid rating !! Blitz rating !! colspan="2" | Rapid !! colspan="2" | Blitz !! Score
|-
| 1 || align=left|
|| 2786 || 2779
| style="background: black; color: white" | ½
| style="background: white; color: black" | ½
| style="background: white; color: black" | 1
| style="background: black; color: white" | 1
|| 3
|-
| 2 || align=left|
|| 2895 || 2920
| style="background: white; color: black" | ½
| style="background: black; color: white" | ½
| style="background: black; color: white" | 0
| style="background: white; color: black" | 0
|| 1
|}

Superbet Rapid & Blitz

Tata Steel India Rapid & Blitz

Grand Chess Tour Finals

Tour standings 
Wildcards (in italics) are not counted in overall standings.

References 

Grand Chess Tour
Chess competitions
2019 in chess